"" ("One fine day we'll see") is a soprano aria from the opera Madama Butterfly (1904) by Giacomo Puccini, set to a libretto by Luigi Illica and Giuseppe Giacosa. It is sung by Cio-Cio San (Butterfly) on stage with Suzuki, as she imagines the return of her absent love, Pinkerton. It is the most famous aria in Madama Butterfly, and one of the most popular pieces in the entire soprano repertoire.

Dramatic setting

Early in act 2, three years after her marriage to U.S. naval officer B. F. Pinkerton, Cio-Cio San ("Butterfly") awaits the return of her long-absent husband to Japan. Her maid, Suzuki, does not believe that Pinkerton will come back, but Butterfly is optimistic. Trying to convince Suzuki of Pinkerton's loyalty, Butterfly sings of an imaginary scene in which a thread of smoke on the far horizon signals the arrival of a white ship into Nagasaki harbour, bringing her long-lost love back to her. The imagined scene culminates in a romantic reunion.

The aria is noted for its lyrical beauty. It is of particular dramatic importance, as Butterfly's yearning expressed in the song is later met with tragedy. Butterfly's longed-for "beautiful day" is heralded at the end of act 2 by the arrival of Pinkerton's ship, but it proves to be her last; Butterfly learns that Pinkerton has married another woman, and at the end of the opera, Butterfly, distraught, takes her own life.  "Un bel dì, vedremo" is especially significant as it appeals to audiences with its emotive melody but also encapsulates the tragedy at the heart of the opera, foretelling Cio-Cio San's inevitable demise.

Performance and recordings

The aria was first performed by the soprano Rosina Storchio at the premiere of Madama Butterfly on 17 February 1904 at the Teatro alla Scala in Milan. In the revised version of the opera (28 May 1904 at the Teatro Grande, in Brescia) it was sung by the Ukrainian soprano Solomiya Krushelnytska.

Deanna Durbin performed the English translation of the aria in the 1939 musical film First Love.

In 1984, the pop musician Malcolm McLaren adapted the aria for his single "Madam Butterfly (Un bel dì, vedremo)", a synth-pop remix of opera and 1980s R&B. The song, which appeared on McLaren's album Fans, reached No. 13 in the UK Singles Chart.

Lyrics

"Un bel dì, vedremo" occurs in act 2 in both the original and the revised versions of the opera. This Italian text is taken from the first version of the libretto, published by Ricordi in 1904.

References

External links
, live performance of Renata Tebaldi
, Maria Callas, orchestra of La Scala, Herbert von Karajan (1955)

Opera excerpts
Arias by Giacomo Puccini
1904 compositions
Soprano arias
Compositions in G-flat major